Max Mirnyi and Daniel Nestor were the defending champions, but Mirnyi decided not to participate.
Nestor played alongside Robert Lindstedt, but lost to Marin Čilić and Juan Martín del Potro in the second round.
Bob and Mike Bryan won the title after defeating Alexander Peya and Bruno Soares 4–6, 7–5, [10–3] in the final.

Seeds
All seeds received byes into the second round.

Draw

Finals

Top half

Bottom half

External links
 Main draw

2013 Aegon Championships